The Drew League is a pro–am basketball league held every summer in Los Angeles, California. Established in 1973, the league has grown in popularity over the years, with NBA players regularly participating in its games.

History 
The Drew League was founded in 1973 by Alvin Wills, who worked at Charles R. Drew Middle School and initially counted 6 teams. The league rose in popularity over the 1980s, with an expanding number of teams (10 in 1985, 14 in 1988) and several high-profile high school, college, and professional players participating in the games. In 1987, Casper Ware Sr. scored 47 points in the Drew League championship game. In 1990 Easy Ed Reed established the all-time high for points scored in a single game with 64. During the 1992 Los Angeles riots, the Drew League organizers decided to keep the league open, offering support to the South Central Los Angeles community.

The league has occasionally attracted NBA players looking for a place to compete during the summer. During the 2011 NBA lockout, the Drew League saw an increase in popularity due to a higher number of NBA players participating. The attendance rose to 800 per game. Over the years, players from various countries such as China, France, Germany, Italy, Japan, and Spain participated in the Drew League. In 2012, to face the increased number of people attending, the Drew League moved from Leon H. Washington Park gym to King/Drew Magnet High School. In 2013, Nike started to sponsor the league. In 2016, the average attendance was 1,100. In 2017 the Drew League was featured in the basketball video game NBA Live 18. Since its foundation, more than 20,000 players have participated in the league. As of 2019, 24 teams compete in the Drew League, with the highest number of participating teams being 28 in the previous seasons.

The 2020 season was canceled due to the COVID-19 pandemic.

Commissioners 
1973–1984: Alvin Willis
1985–present: Oris "Dino" Smiley

Venues 
1973–2005: Charles R. Drew Middle School, Compton Avenue, Florence-Graham
2006–2011: Col. Leon H. Washington Park, Maie Avenue, Florence-Graham
2012–present: King/Drew Magnet High School, East 120th Street, Willowbrook

Notable players 

Greg Anthony
Trevor Ariza
Marvin Bagley III
Michael Beasley
Steve Blake
Bobby Brown
LaMelo Ball
LiAngelo Ball
Jordan Bell
Shannon Brown
Kobe Bryant
Jordan Clarkson
John Collins
Darren Collison
Lester Conner
Michael Cooper
DeMarcus Cousins
Baron Davis
Glen Davis
Austin Daye
DeMar DeRozan
Andre Drummond
Kevin Durant
Tari Eason
Tyreke Evans
David Fizdale
Malachi Flynn
The Game
Rudy Gay
Paul George
Jonathan Gibson
Taj Gibson
Tim Hardaway Jr.
James Harden
Montrezl Harrell
Jason Hart
Solomon Hill
LeBron James
Brandon Jennings
Pooh Jeter
Stanley Johnson
Wesley Johnson
Kyle Kuzma
Ty Lawson
Matt Leinart
Raymond Lewis
Tyronn Lue
Kenyon Martin Jr.
JaVale McGee
De'Anthony Melton
Andre Miller
Cuttino Mobley
Evan Mobley
Shareef O'Neal
Onyeka Okongwu
Chris Paul
Paul Pierce
Kevin Porter Jr.
Taurean Prince
Gabe Pruitt
Julius Randle
Nate Robinson
Terrence Ross
Metta Sandiford-Artest
Byron Scott
Franklin Session
Pascal Siakam
Craig Smith
J. R. Smith
Joe Smith
Dane Suttle
Isaiah Thomas
Klay Thompson
P. J. Tucker
Denzel Valentine
John Wall
Casper Ware Jr.
Casper Ware Sr.
Earl Watson
Derrick Williams
John "Hot Plate" Williams
Lou Williams
Marcus Williams
Delon Wright
Dorell Wright
Nick Young
Trae Young

References

External links 
Official website

1973 establishments in California
Basketball in Los Angeles
Basketball leagues in the United States
Semi-professional sports leagues
Willowbrook, California
Sports leagues established in 1973